Haji Mohammad Siddiq Choudri (Urdu: حاجى محمد صديق چودھری; b. 1912—27 February 2004), popularly known as HMS Choudhri, was a Pakistan Navy admiral who was the first native Commander in Chief of Pakistan Navy. 

In 1953, he was appointed as second Commander-in-Chief after taking over the command from Royal Navy's Rear Admiral J.W. Jefford, and served under two Governor-Generals from 1953 to 1956, and then under President Iskander Mirza from 1956 until 1959. He resigned from his command due to differences regarding the navy's plans of modernization and to end the interservice rivalry with Army GHQ, Pakistan MoD, and the Presidency on 26 January 1959. He was one of the only few military officials who resigned from their commission over the disagreement with the civilian government and was eventually succeeded by Vice-Admiral A. R. Khan on 28 February 1959.

He died on 27 February 2004 and was buried in military graveyard in Karachi with full military honors.

Early life
Haji Mohammad Choudhri was born in Batala, Punjab, British India in 1912 in an Arain family He is the cousin of Dr Raees M Mushtaq’s Father. Very little is known about his early life which based on combined military history of India and Pakistan. As many of contemporaries in the British Indian military, he was educated at the Rashtriya Indian Military College and later joined the Britannia Royal Naval College in the United Kingdom.

Naval career

Early career
He was among the first Indians and first Indian Muslim to be commissioned a midshipman in the Royal Indian Navy's Executive Branch in 1931. On 1 September 1933, he was promoted to sub-lieutenant, receiving promotion to lieutenant on 1 September 1936. On 24 May 1938, he was assigned to the escort vessel HMIS Lawrence as its first lieutenant and was serving in this position at the outbreak of war in 1939; the future Indian Navy CNS Sourendra Nath Kohli served under him as a sub-lieutenant.

World War II
He was trained as torpedo and anti-submarine specialist and held various officer's appointments both at sea and with land-based naval formations before and after the World War II. At the outset of the war, he saw action against the Italian Regia Marina in the Red Sea and off the Somali coasts. In 1942, he was sent to Britain where he qualified as a specialist officer in the Torpedo Branch. He then went to the United States in 1943, delivering lectures on the role of the Royal Indian Navy.

On 25 March 1944, Choudhri was promoted to acting lieutenant-commander and given command of the minesweeper HMIS Rohilkand. On 1 September 1944, he was promoted to substantive lieutenant-commander, the first Indian to become a substantive senior line officer in the RIN. He participated in the Pacific theatre against the  Imperial Japanese Navy. On 10 February 1945, he was promoted to acting commander and assigned to the sloop HMIS Godavari as its executive officer. In the 1945 Birthday Honours List, he was appointed a Member of the Order of the British Empire, Military Division (MBE). He witnessed the Japanese surrender in 1945 and commanded a naval division that consisted of the two-ship formation that represented the Royal Indian Navy. After the war, Choudhri served on the Armed Forces Nationalisation Committee, and was promoted to acting captain in July 1947.

Post-Independence
In 1947, Choudhri served on the committee that was involved in the division of the RIN's assets between India and Pakistan. At the time of the partition of British India, Captain Choudhri was the senior-most Indian naval officer. He decided to opt for Pakistan in 1947. He was among the first twenty naval officers who joined the Royal Pakistan Navy (RPN) as a captain with a service number PN. 0001. He was the first most senior and the only captain in the navy in terms of seniority list provided by the Royal Indian Navy to the Ministry of Defense (MoD) in 1947. He did not actively participated in first war with India in 1947, instead he commanded a destroyer from Karachi to Mumbai to oversee the evacuation of Indian emigrants to Pakistan. In 1950, he was promoted to one-star rank, Commodore, and appointed to serve as deputy commander in chief under Rear-Admiral J.W. Jefford. Jefford's retirement was due in 1951 and favoured continuously appointing the British officers in the armed forces.

Commander-in-Chief
The Pakistan government called for appointing a native commanders-in-chief of army, air force and navy and dismissed deputation appointments from the British military. In terms of seniority, he was the most senior officer to be appointed as an admiral in the navy but the British Admiralty and Commodore Choudhri himself was in doubt to be appointed as commander of navy mainly because of his youth and lack of experience in military staffing. Prime Minister Liaquat Ali Khan approved his nomination papers as navy's commander in chief on the condition that he would spend a year in commanding a squadron in sea, and then attend the Imperial Defence College. Upon returning to Pakistan in 1952 after he gained staff officer degree, he was appointed as Deputy Commander-in-Chief at the NHQ where he established staff corps and administration.

Although, the Pakistani government announced the appointment of navy's first native commander in chief in 1951 and Commodore Choudhri's nomination papers being approved by Prime Minister Ali Khan also in 1951, his appointment as navy's first native commander-in-chief came only in effect in 1953 with the crucial help provided from the army's Commander-in-Chief General Ayub Khan. He was promoted as rear admiral and assumed the command of the navy with an objective of expanding navy's resources and infrastructure.

In 1951, Admiral Choudri decided to built the submarines and warships at the Karachi Shipyard & Engineering Works, relaying his plans to the Ministry of Defence and Ministry of Finance, but was told by the civilian planners that the "second-hand ships from the United Kingdom would be better off for Pakistan", that eventually led the Navy to rely on the obsolete vessels that had to be acquire from the United Kingdom.

From 1953 to 1956, he bitterly negotiated with the U.S. Navy and Royal Navy over the acquisition of warship and made several unsuccessful attempts for the procurement of submarines imported from the United States.  In 1954, he convinced the U.S. government to provide monetary support for modernization of aging O–class destroyers and minesweepers, while commissioning the Ch–class destroyers from British Navy.

In 1955, Admiral Choudhri cancelled and disbanded the British military tradition in the navy when the U.S. Navy's advisers were dispatched to the Pakistani military. British military tradition were only kept in the air force due to being under its British commander and major staff consisting of Royal Air Force officers. Despite initiatives, the Admiralty's influence slowly vanished from the navy until the native officers were educated and promoted to flag ranks to replace the Royal Navy's officers

In 1956, Admiral Choudhri sent recommendations for the construction of the seaport in Ormara and a naval base that would linked the Sonmiani but it was bypassed Ministry of Shipping that cited financial constraints.

In 1957, he finalize the sale of cruiser warship from the United Kingdom, and used the government's own fund to induct the warship that caused a great ire against Admiral Choudhri by the Finance ministry in the country. In 1958, he made an unsuccessful attempt induct the imported submarines from Sweden using the American funds that was halted by the United States and the Pakistan's own Finance ministry despite he had support from Commander-in-Chief of the Pakistan Army General Ayub.

Resignation
In 1958, his Navy NHQ staff began fighting with the Army GHQ staff and the Ministry of Defence (MoD) over the plans regarding the modernization of the navy. He was in bitter conflict with General Ayub who saw the purchase of PNS Baber and his submarine procurement approaches had jeopardized the foreign military relations with the United States. The MoD did sanctioned to pay off the costly PNS Baber but halted the crucial funds for the operations of the navy which had been assembled since 1956.

In another Joint Chiefs of Staff meeting chaired by General Ayub in 1958, he became involved with heated debate over the financial costs for the naval operations in deep sea. General Ayub reportedly reached out to the President Iskander Mirza and lodged a complained against Admiral Choudhri by noting the Admiral of "neither having the brain, imagination or depth of thought to understand such (defence) problems nor the vision or the ability to make any contribution." Admiral Choudhri then was called to meet with President Mirza to resolve the interservice rivalry between the army and navy but it was ended with "stormy interview" with the President.

Upon returning to NHQ, Admiral Choudhry decided to tender his resignation to broke the interservice impasse in protest as result of having differences with Navy's plans of expansion and modernization. He resigned the command of the navy on 26 January 1959 and cited to President: "major decision [which] have been taken with disagreement with the technical advice I have consistently tendered.... concerning the concept of our defence, the appointment of our available budget, and the size and shape of our Navy."

In 1958, Vice-Admiral Afzal Rahman Khan, who was known to be a confidant of General Ayub Khan, was appointed as naval chief by President Mirza.

Post-retirement and death
After retiring from Navy, he went on to establish Merchant Navy and promoted civilian shipping trade throughout his life. After retiring from Navy in 1959, he founded and became director of Pakistan Institute of Maritime Affairs (PIMA) which he remained associated with until his death in 2004.

He avoided politics and provided no commentaries on conflicts and wars with neighboring India in successive years of 1965, 1971, and 1999. He died of old age on 27 February 2004 and was buried in a  military graveyard in Karachi.

In his honor, the government established the "HMS Choudhri Memorial Hall" at the National Defence University in Islamabad in 2005.

References

External links
Pakistani Defence Forum
Official website of Pakistan Navy

 

1912 births
2004 deaths
Punjabi people
People from Gurdaspur district
Rashtriya Indian Military College alumni
Graduates of Britannia Royal Naval College
Royal Indian Navy officers
Indian people of World War II
Members of the Order of the British Empire
Graduates of the Royal College of Defence Studies
People of the Indo-Pakistani War of 1947
Pakistan Navy admirals
Chiefs of Naval Staff (Pakistan)
Recipients of Hilal-i-Imtiaz
Pakistan Merchant Navy
Indian Members of the Order of the British Empire